Acrolophus sacchari is a moth of the family Acrolophidae. It is found in Guyana.

References

Moths described in 1914
sacchari